Kalwan Assembly constituency is one of the 288 Vidhan Sabha (legislative assembly) constituencies of Maharashtra state in western India, located in Nashik district.

Overview
Kalwan is part of the Dindori Lok Sabha constituency along with five other Vidhan Sabha segments, namely Chandwad Assembly constituency, Dindori, Nandgaon, Niphad Assembly constituency and Yeola Assembly constituency .

Members of Legislative Assembly
 1990: Arjun Tulshiram Pawar, BJP
 1995: Arjun Tulshiram Pawar, BJP
 1999: Arjun Tulshiram Pawar, NCP
 2004: Arjun Tulshiram Pawar, NCP
 2009: Arjun Tulshiram Pawar, NCP
 2014: Jiva Pandu Gavit, CPI-M
2019: Nitin Arjun Pawar, NCP

Election results

Assembly Elections 2004

Assembly Elections 2009

Assembly Elections 2014

Assembly Elections 2019

See also
 Kalwan
 List of constituencies of Maharashtra Vidhan Sabha

References

Assembly constituencies of Nashik district
Assembly constituencies of Maharashtra